Novosyuryukayevo (Yañı Süräkäy) is a rural locality (a village) in Meshchegarovsky Selsoviet, Salavatsky District, Bashkortostan, Russia. The population was 145 as of 2010. There are 3 streets.

Geography 
Novosyuryukayevo is located 54 km southeast of Maloyaz (the district's administrative centre) by road. Mursalimkino is the nearest rural locality.

References 

Rural localities in Salavatsky District